Renan Junior Miranda Leite Silva (born January 23, 1986 in Várzea Grande, Brazil) is a Brazilian footballer, playing as right midfielder, for Operário Futebol Clube at the Campeonato Estadual Mato-grossense (Local championship of Mato Grosso State).

Teams
  Juventus (SP) 2004
  Figueirense 2005
  Universidad de Concepción 2006
  Fernández Vial 2007
  Operário Ltda 2008-2009
  Luverdense 2009-2011
  Cuiabá 2011-2012
  Uberlândia 2012
  Cuiabá 2013
  CEOV Operário 2014-

References
 

1986 births
Living people
Brazilian footballers
Brazilian expatriate footballers
Cuiabá Esporte Clube players
Uberlândia Esporte Clube players
Luverdense Esporte Clube players
Figueirense FC players
Operário Futebol Clube (Várzea Grande) players
Universidad de Concepción footballers
C.D. Arturo Fernández Vial footballers
Primera B de Chile players
Chilean Primera División players
Expatriate footballers in Chile
Association football midfielders
CE Operário Várzea-Grandense players